Buehl House, also known as Dr. John Clark House, in Berea, Ohio, was built in 1859.  It was listed on the National Register of Historic Places in 1976.

The Berea Historical Society operates the Mahler Museum & History Center in the house.

References

External links

 Berea Historical Society

Houses on the National Register of Historic Places in Ohio
Houses completed in 1859
Berea, Ohio
Houses in Cuyahoga County, Ohio
National Register of Historic Places in Cuyahoga County, Ohio
Museums in Cuyahoga County, Ohio
Historic house museums in Ohio
1859 establishments in Ohio